The 1963–64 Montreal Canadiens season was the club's 55th season of play. The team placed first in the regular season, earning top seed in the playoffs, but lost to the Toronto Maple Leafs in the semi-finals.

Regular season

Final standings

Record vs. opponents

Schedule and results

Player statistics 
Scoring

Goaltending

Playoffs

Semi-finals 

March 26, 1964, Toronto Maple Leafs 2 – 0
March 28, 1964, Toronto Maple Leafs 1 – 2
March 31, 1964, at Toronto Maple Leafs 3 – 2
April 2, 1964, at Toronto Maple Leafs 3 – 5
April 4, 1964, Toronto Maple Leafs 4 – 2
April 7, 1964, at Toronto Maple Leafs 0 – 3
April 9, 1964, Toronto Maple Leafs 1 – 3

Player statistics 
Scoring

Goaltending

Transactions 
 June 4, 1963 – Jacques Plante was traded to the New York Rangers, along with Phil Goyette and Don Marshall, in exchange for Gump Worsley, Dave Balon, and Leon Rochefort.

Draft picks
Montreal's draft picks at the 1963 NHL Amateur Draft held at the Queen Elizabeth Hotel in Montreal, Quebec.

Awards and records

See also 
 1963–64 NHL season

References 
Canadiens on Hockey Database
Canadiens on NHL Reference

Montreal Canadiens seasons
Mon
Mon
1960s in Montreal
1963 in Quebec
1964 in Quebec